The black-fronted fig parrot (Cyclopsitta nigrifrons) is a species of parrot in the family Psittaculidae.
It is found in northern New Guinea.
Its natural habitat is subtropical or tropical moist lowland forests.

Subspecies 
There are two recognised subspecies of the black-fronted fig parrot.
C. g. nigrifrons – Reichenow, 1891
C. g. amabilis – Reichenow, 1891: Also known as the creamy-breasted fig parrot.

References

Cyclopsitta
Birds of New Guinea
Birds described in 1891